British Standards are the standards produced by BSI Group which is incorporated under a Royal Charter (and which is formally designated as the National Standards Body (NSB) for the UK). The BSI Group produces British Standards under the authority of the Charter, which lays down as one of the BSI's objectives to:

Standards 

 BS 0 A standard for standards specifies Development, Structure and Drafting of British Standards themselves.
 BS 1 Lists of Rolled Sections for Structural Purposes
 BS 2 Specification and Sections of Tramway Rails and Fishplates
 BS 3 Report on Influence of Gauge Length and Section of Test Bar on the Percentage of Elongation
 BS 4 Specification for Structural Steel Sections
 BS 5 Report on Locomotives for Indian Railways 
 BS 6 Properties of Rolled Sections for Structural Purposes
 BS 7 Dimensions of Copper Conductors Insulated Annealed, for Electric Power and Light
 BS 8 Specification for Tubular Tramway Poles
 BS 9 Specification and Sections of Bull Head Railway Rails
 BS 10 Tables of Pipe Flanges
 BS 11 Specifications and Sections of Flat Bottom Railway Rails
 BS 12 Specification for Portland Cement
 BS 13 Specification for Structural Steel for Shipbuilding
 BS 14 Specification for Structural Steel for Marine Boilers
 BS 15 Specification for Structural Steel for Bridges, etc., and General Building Construction
 BS 16 Specification for telegraph material (insulators, pole fittings, etc.)
 BS 17 Interim Report on Electrical Machinery
 BS 18 Forms of Tensile Test Pieces
 BS 19 Report on Temperature Experiments on Field Coils of Electrical Machines
 BS 20 Report on BS Screw Threads
 BS 21 Report on Pipe Threads for Iron or Steel Pipes and Tubes
 BS 22 Report on Effect of Temperature on Insulating Materials
 BS 23 Standards for Trolley Groove and Wire, 
 BS 24 Specifications for Material used in the Construction of Standards for Railway Rolling Stock
 BS 25 Report on Errors in Workmanship Based on Measurements Carried Out for the Committee by the National Physical Laboratory
 BS 26 Second Report on Locomotives for Indian Railways (Superseding No 5) 
 BS 27 Report on Standard Systems of Limit Gauges for Running Fits
 BS 28 Report on Nuts, Bolt Heads and Spanners
 BS 29 Specification for Ingot Steel Forgings for Marine Purposes 
 BS 30 Specification for Steel Castings for Marine Purposes 
 BS 31 Specification for Steel Conduits for Electrical Wiring
 BS 32 Specification for Steel Bars for use in Automatic Machines
 BS 33 Carbon Filament Electric Lamps
 BS 34 Tables of BS Whitworth, BS Fine and BS Pipe Threads
 BS 35 Specification for Copper Alloy Bars for use in Automatic Machines 
 BS 36 Report on British Standards for Electrical Machinery
 BS 37 Specification for Electricity Meters 
 BS 38 Report on British Standards Systems for Limit Gauges for Screw Threads
 BS 39 Combined Report on BS Screw Threads
 BS 40 Specification for Spigot and Socket Cast Iron Low Pressure Heating Pipes
 BS 41 Specification for Spigot and Socket Cast Iron Flue or Smoke Pipes
 BS 42 Report on Reciprocating Steam Engines for Electrical Purposes
 BS 43 Specification for Charcoal Iron Lip-welded Boiler Tubes
 BS 44 Specification for Cast Iron Pipes for Hydraulic Power
 BS 45 Report on Dimensions for Sparking Plugs (for Internal Combustion Engines)
 BS 46 Specification for Keys and Keyways
 BS 47 Steel Fishplates for Bullhead and Flat Bottom Railway Rails, Specification and Sections of 
 BS 48 Specification for Wrought Iron of Smithing Quality for Shipbuilding  (Grade D)
 BS 49 Specification for Ammeters and Voltmeters
 BS 50 Third Report on Locomotives for Indian Railways (Superseding Nos. 5 and 26) 
 BS 51 Specification for Wrought Iron for use in Railway Rolling Stock (‘Best Yorkshire’ and Grades A, B and C)
 BS 52 Specification for bayonet lamp-caps lampholders and B.C. adaptors (lampholder plugs)
 BS 53 Specification for Cold Drawn Weldless Steel Boiler Tubes for Locomotive Boilers
 BS 54 Report on Screw Threads, Nuts and Bolt Heads for use in Automobile Construction
 BS 55 Report on Hard Drawn Copper and Bronze Wire
 BS 56 Definitions of Yield Point and Elastic Limit
 BS 57 Report on heads for Small Screws
 BS 58 Specification for Spigot and socket Cast Iron Soil Pipes
 BS 59 Specification for Spigot and Socket Cast Iron Waste and Ventilating Pipes (for other than Soil Purposes)
 BS 60 Report of Experiments on Tungsten Filament Glow Lamps
 BS 61 Specification for Copper Tubes and their Screw Threads (primarily for domestic and similar work)
 BS 62 Screwing for Marine Boiler Stays, 
 BS 63 Specification for Sizes of Broken Stone and Chippings 
 BS 64 Specification for Fishbolts and Nuts for Railway Rails
 BS 65 Specification for Salt-Glazed Ware Pipes, 
 BS 66 Specification for Copper-Alloy Three-Piece Unions (for Low and Medium Pressure Screwed Copper Tubes)
 BS 67 Specification for Two and Three-Plate Ceiling Roses
 BS 68 Method of Specifying the Resistance of Steel Conductor Rails 
 BS 69 Report on Tungsten Filament Glow Lamps (Vacuum Type) for Automobiles
 BS 70 Report on Pneumatic Tyre Rims for Automobiles, Motor Cycles and Cycles
 BS 71 Report on Dimensions of Wheel Rims and Tyre Bands for Solid Rubber Tyres for Automobiles
 BS 72 British Standardisation Rules for Electrical Machinery, 
 BS 73 Specification for Two-Pin Wall Plugs and Sockets (Five-, Fifteen- and Thirty-Ampere) 
 BS 74 Charging Plug and Socket, for Vehicles Propelled by Electric Secondary Batteries, Specification for
 BS 75 Steels for Automobiles, Specification for Wrought 
 BS 76 Report of and Specifications for Tar and Pitch for Road Purposes 
 BS 77 Specification. Voltages for a.c. transmission and distribution systems
 BS 78 Specification for Cast Iron Pipes and Special Castings for Water, Gas and Sewage
 BS 79 Report on Dimensions of Special Trackwork for Tramways
 BS 80 Magnetos for Automobile Purposes
 BS 81 Specification for Instrument Transformers
 BS 82 Specification for Starters for Electric Motors
 BS 83 Standard of Reference for Dope and Protective Covering for Aircraft
 BS 84 Report on Screw Threads (British Standard Fine), and their Tolerances (Superseding parts of Reports Nos. 20 and 33) 
 BS 86 Report on Dimensions of Magnetos for Aircraft Purposes 
 BS 87 Report on Dimensions for Airscrew Hubs
 BS 88 Specification for cartridge fuses for voltages up to and including 1000 V a.c. and 1500 V d.c. Originally titled: “Specification for Electric Cut-Outs (Low Pressure, Type O)”
 BS 89 Specification for Indicating Ammeters, Voltmeters, Wattmeters, Frequency and Power-Factor Meters
 BS 90 Specification for Recording (Graphic) Ammeters, Voltmeters and Wattmeters
 BS 95 Tables of Corrections to Effective Diameter required to compensate Pitch and Angle Errors in Screw Threads of Whitworth Form
 BS 98 Specification for Goliath Lamp Caps and Lamp Holders
 BS 103 Specification for Falling Weight Testing Machines for Rails 
 BS 104 Sections of Light Flat Bottom Railway Rails and Fishplates
 BS 105 Sections of Light and Heavy Bridge Type Railway Rails
 BS 107 Standard for Rolled Sections for Magnet Steel
 BS 196 for protected-type non-reversible plugs, socket-outlets cable-couplers and appliance-couplers with earthing contacts for single phase a.c. circuits up to 250 volts
 BS 275 Specification Dimensions of rivets
 BS 308 a now deleted standard for engineering drawing conventions, having been absorbed into BS 8888.
 BS 317  for Hand-Shield and Side Entry Pattern Three-Pin Wall Plugs and Sockets (Two Pin and Earth Type)
 BS 336 for fire hose couplings and ancillary equipment
 BS 372 for Side-entry wall plugs and sockets for domestic purposes (Part 1 superseded BS 73 and Part 2 superseded BS 317)
 BS 381 for colours used in identification, coding and other special purposes
 BS 476 for fire resistance of building materials / elements
 BS 499 Welding terms and symbols. 
 BS 546 for Two-pole and earthing-pin plugs, socket-outlets and socket-outlet adaptors for AC (50–60 Hz) circuits up to 250V
 BS 857 for safety glass for land transport
 BS 970 Specification for wrought steels for mechanical and allied engineering purposes
 BS 984 Method for Determination of net mass of retail packages of knitting and rug yarns
 BS 987C Camouflage Colours
 BS 1088 for marine plywood
 BS 1192 for Construction Drawing Practice. Part 5 (BS1192-5:1998) concerns Guide for structuring and exchange of CAD data.
 BS 1361 for cartridge fuses for a.c. circuits in domestic and similar premises
 BS 1362 for cartridge fuses for BS 1363 power plugs
 BS 1363 for mains power plugs and sockets
 BS 1377 Methods of test for soils for civil engineering.
 BS 1572 Colours for Flat Finishes for Wall Decoration
 BS 1870 for safety footwear.
 BS 1881 Testing Concrete 
 BS 1852 Specification for marking codes for resistors and capacitors
 BS 1952 and BS 1953 – Copper alloy gate valves for general purposes. Superseded by BS 5154.
 BS 2060 Copper alloy screw-down stop valves for general purposes. Superseded by BS 5154.
 BS 2660 Colours for building and decorative paints
 BS 2777 Specification for asbestos-cement cisterns
 BS 2979 Transliteration of Cyrillic and Greek Letters
 BS 3262 Hot-applied thermoplastic road marking materials 
 BS 3506 for unplasticized PVC pipe for industrial uses
 BS 3621 Thief resistant lock assembly. Key egress.
 BS 3943 Specification for plastics waste traps
 BS 4142 Methods for rating and assessing industrial and commercial sound
 BS 4293 for residual current-operated circuit-breakers
 BS 4343 for industrial electrical power connectors
 BS 4532 Specification for snorkels and face masks. 
 BS 4573 Specification for 2-pin reversible plugs and shaver socket-outlets
 BS 4800 for paint colours used in building construction
 BS 4900 for vitreous enamel colours used in building construction
 BS 4901 for plastic colours used in building construction
 BS 4902 for sheet / tile floor covering colours used in building construction
 BS 4960 for weighing instruments for domestic cookery
 BS 4962 for plastics pipes and fittings for use as subsoil field drains
 BS 5145 Specification for lined industrial rubber boots.
 BS 5154 Specifications for two types of globe valves, globe stop and check valves, and check and gate valves, made out of one of two alloys of copper, zinc, lead, tin. This standard is a metric edition of BS 1952, BS 1953 and BS 2060. 
 BS 5228 Code of practice for noise and vibration control on construction and open sites
 BS 5252 for colour-coordination in building construction
BS 5306: Fire extinguishing installations 
BS 5306-0:2011: Guide for the selection of installed systems and other fire equipment
BS 5306-1:2006: Hose reels and foam inlets
BS 5306-2:1990: Specification for sprinkler systems
BS 5306-3:2017: Fire extinguishing installations and equipment on premises. Commissioning and maintenance of portable fire extinguishers. Code of practice
BS 5306-4:2001+A1: 2012: Specification for carbon dioxide systems
BS 5306-8:2012: Fire extinguishing installations and equipment on premises
BS 5306-9:2015: Recharging of portable fire extinguishers – Code of practice
 BS 5400 for steel, concrete and composite bridges
 BS 5499 for graphical symbols and signs in building construction; including shape, colour and layout
 BS 5544 for anti-bandit glazing (glazing resistant to manual attack)
 BS 5750 for quality management, the ancestor of ISO 9000
 BS 5759 Specification for webbing load restraint assemblies for use in surface transport
 BS 5837 for protection of trees during construction work
 BS 5839 for fire detection and alarm systems for buildings
 BS 5930 for site investigations
 BS 5950 for structural steel
 BS 5975 Code of practice for temporary works procedures and the permissible stress design of falsework
 BS 5993 Specification for cricket balls 
 BS 6008 for preparation of a liquor of tea for use in sensory tests
 BS 6312 for telephone plugs and sockets
 BS 6472 Guide to evaluation of human exposure to vibration in buildings
 BS 6651 code of practice for protection of structures against lightning; replaced by BS EN 62305 (IEC 62305) series.
 BS 6701 installation, operation and maintenance of telecommunications equipment and telecommunications cabling
 BS 6879 for British geocodes, a superset of ISO 3166-2:GB
BS 7346-8: 2013 Components for smoke control systems: code of practice for planning, design, installation, commissioning and maintenance 
 BS 7385 Evaluation and measurement for vibration in buildings
 BS 7430 code of practice for earthing
 BS 7671 Requirements for Electrical Installations, The IEE Wiring Regulations, produced by the IET.
 BS 7799 for information security, the ancestor of the ISO/IEC 27000 family of standards, including 27002 (formerly 17799)
 BS 7901 for recovery vehicles and vehicle recovery equipment
 BS 7909 Code of practice for temporary electrical systems for entertainment and related purposes
 BS 7971 Elastomer Insulated Fire Resistant (limited circuit integrity) cables for fixed wiring in ships and on mobile and fixed offshore units
 BS 7919 Electric cables. Flexible cables rated up to 450/750V, for use with appliances and equipment intended for industrial and similar environments
 BS 7910 guide to methods for assessing the acceptability of flaws in metallic structures
 BS 7925 Software testing
 BS 7971 Protective clothing and equipment for use in violent situations and in training
 BS 8110 for structural concrete
BS 8210:2012 Guide to facilities maintenance management, replaced by BS 8210:2020 Facilities maintenance management. Code of practice.
 BS 8233 Guidance on sound insulation and noise reduction in buildings
 BS 8442 Miscellaneous road traffic signs and devices - requirements and test methods
 BS 8484 for the provision of lone worker device services
 BS 8485 for the characterization and remediation from ground gas in affected developments
 BS 8494 (2007), for portable apparatuses detecting and measuring carbon dioxide levels in ambient air or extraction systems
BS 8534:2011 Construction procurement policies, strategies and procedures: Code of practice
 BS 8546 Travel adaptors compatible with UK plug and socket system.
BS 8572:2018 Procurement of Facility-Related Services Code of Practice: developed to establish a common and standardised approach towards the way in which facilities services are both specified and managed 
 BS 8888 for engineering drawing and technical product specification
 BS 8900-1 Managing sustainable development of organizations.
 BS 8900-2 Managing sustainable development of organizations. Framework for assessment against BS 8900-1
 BS 9997 Fire risk management systems.
 BS 9999 Fire safety in the design, management and use of buildings. Code of practice 
 BS 15000 for IT Service Management, (ITIL), now ISO/IEC 20000
 BS 3G 101 for general requirements for mechanical and electromechanical aircraft indicators
 BS 10008 best practice for the implementation and operation of electronic information management systems

BS EN standards

 BS EN 12195 Load restraining on road vehicles.
BS EN 15331:2011 Criteria for design, management and control of maintenance services for buildings 
BS EN ISO 41012 Facility management – Guidance on strategic sourcing and the development of agreements 
 BS EN 60204 Safety of machinery
 BS EN 61184:2017 Bayonet lampholders, fourth edition.
 BS EN ISO 4210 – Cycles. Safety Requirements for Bicycles

References

 List of
British Standards